The  was a ministry of the Government of Japan from 1949 to 2001. The MITI was one of the most powerful government agencies in Japan and, at the height of its influence, effectively ran much of Japanese industrial policy, funding research and directing investment.  In the  wake of a 2000 study by Japan’s Ministry of Finance, it was determined that MITI's "Japanese model was not the source of Japanese competitiveness but the cause of our failure.”  In 2001, MITI was merged with other agencies during the Central Government Reform to form the newly created Ministry of Economy, Trade and Industry (METI).

History
MITI was created with the split of the Ministry of Commerce and Industry in May 1949 and given the mission for coordinating international trade policy with other groups, such as the Bank of Japan, the Economic planning Agency, and the various commerce-related cabinet ministries.  At the time it was created, Japan was still recovering from the economic disaster of World War II.  With inflation rising and productivity failing to keep up, the government sought a better mechanism for reviving the Japanese economy.

MITI has been responsible not only in the areas of exports and imports but also for all domestic industries and businesses not specifically covered by other ministries in the areas of investment in plant and equipment, pollution control, energy and power, some aspects of foreign economic assistance, and consumer complaints.  This span has allowed MITI to integrate conflicting policies, such as those on pollution control and export competitiveness, to minimize damage to export industries.

MITI has served as an architect of industrial policy, an arbiter on industrial problems and disputes, and a regulator.  A major objective of the ministry has been to strengthen the country's industrial base.  It has not managed Japanese trade and industry along the lines of a centrally planned economy, but it has provided industries with administrative guidance and other direction, both formal and informal, on modernization, technology, investments in new plants and equipment, and domestic and foreign competition.

The close relationship between MITI and Japanese industry has led to foreign trade policy that often complements the ministry's efforts to strengthen domestic manufacturing interests.  MITI facilitated the early development of nearly all major industries by providing protection from import competition, technological intelligence, help in licensing foreign technology, access to foreign exchange, and assistance in mergers.

These policies to promote domestic industry and to protect it from international competition were strongest in the 1950s and 1960s.  As industry became stronger and as MITI lost some of its policy tools, such as control over allocation of foreign exchange, MITI's policies also changed. The success of Japanese exports and the tension it has caused in other countries led MITI to provide guidance on limiting exports of particular products to various countries.  Starting in 1981, MITI presided over the establishment of voluntary restraints on automobile exports to the United States to allay criticism from American manufacturers and their unions.

Similarly, MITI was forced to liberalize import policies, despite its traditional protectionist focus. During the 1980s, the ministry helped to craft a number of market-opening and import promoting measures, including the creation of an import promotion office within the ministry. The close relationship between MITI and industry allowed the ministry to play such a role in fostering more open markets, but conflict remained between the need to open markets and the desire to continue promoting new and growing domestic industries.

As late as the 1980s, prime ministers were expected to serve a tenure as MITI minister before taking over the government.  MITI worked closely with Japanese business interests, and was largely responsible for keeping the domestic market closed to most foreign companies.

MITI lost some influence when the switch was made to a floating exchange rate between the United States dollar and yen in 1971.  Before that point, MITI had been able to keep the exchange rate artificially low, which benefited Japan's exporters.  Later, intense lobbying from other countries, particularly the United States, pushed Japan to introduce more liberal trade laws that further lessened MITI's grip over the Japanese economy.  By the mid-1980s, the ministry was helping foreign corporations set up operations in Japan.

The decline of MITI was described by Johnstone:
... by the early 1980s, when Western analysts first became aware of MITI, the ministry's glory days were over. In 1979 MITI lost its primary instrument of control over Japanese firms – allocation of foreign currency. The power, that is, to decide who could – and who could not – import technologies. [For example] ... MITI bureaucrats attempted to deny fledgling Sony the $25,000 the company needed to license transistor technology from Western Electric.

However MITI still continued to benefit industry, especially in semiconductors, where, to overcome resistance to a new technology, it forced every electronic company to have at least one CMOS project going.

The influence of MITI shrank in the 1990s because of deregulation and the collapse of the Japanese asset price bubble, and the creation of the World Trade Organization made it more difficult for governments to protect local companies from foreign competition.  The declining significance of MITI to Japanese companies made it a less powerful agency within the bureaucracy, and by the end of the 20th century, it was folded into a larger body.  In 2001, it was reorganized into the Ministry of Economy, Trade, and Industry (METI).

Agencies
Important MITI agencies include:
 National Institute of Advanced Industrial Science and Technology (AIST)
 Japan External Trade Organization (JETRO)
 Japan Patent Office (JPO)

Administrative Vice-Ministers

 is the highest position in a ministry filled by a career bureaucrat rather than a political appointee.

See also
 Fifth generation computer
 Economy of Japan
 Minister of Economy, Trade and Industry

Sources
  – Japan

Notes

External links
  METI website

1949 establishments in Japan
2001 disestablishments in Japan
MITI projects
Japan, International Trade and Industry
Japan, International Trade and Industry
International Trade and Industry
Economic nationalism
Industrial policy